Street Sounds Hip Hop Electro 15 is the fifteenth compilation album in a series and was released 1986 on the StreetSounds label. The album was released on LP and cassette and contains eight electro music and old school hip hop tracks mixed by Herbie Laidley. The LP came with a bonus 7" single record with "The Man Marley Marl" by Marley Marl on the A-side, and "Stronger Than Strong (Remix)" by Faze One on the B-side. Track four on side one was released the following year as "South Bronx" by Boogie Down Productions.

Track listing

References

External links
 Street Sounds Hip Hop Electro 15 at Discogs

1986 compilation albums
Hip hop compilation albums
Electro compilation albums